The Gordon, made by Vernons Industries Ltd. based at Bidston, then in Cheshire (now Merseyside), was a British three-wheeled motorcar produced from 1954 until 1958. It was named after Gordon Duncan Keen from Southport who was a member of the design team.

History
The company, a subsidiary of Vernons Pools, began in Bidston in 1954 for the production of automobiles. The designer was Erling Poppe who had previously worked for John Marston's Sunbeam car company in Wolverhampton. Several hundred Gordons were made before production ended in 1958.

Models
The company only manufactured one model, a three-wheeled two seater with a single front wheel. The single-cylinder, 197 cc, Villiers engine was mounted next to the driver (RHD), outside of the body with an external chain-drive to one rear wheel. Access to the interior was via a single door. The steel body had a folding fabric roof, and at £300 it was the cheapest car on the UK market.

See also
 List of car manufacturers of the United Kingdom

References

Sources 
 Harald Linz, Halwart Schrader: Die Internationale Automobil-Enzyklopädie. United Soft Media Verlag, München 2008, . 
 George Nick Georgano (Chefredakteur): The Beaulieu Encyclopedia of the Automobile. Volume 2: G–O. Fitzroy Dearborn Publishers, Chicago 2001, . (englisch)

Defunct motor vehicle manufacturers of England
1954 establishments in the United Kingdom
Three-wheeled motor vehicles
Cars introduced in 1954